Diah may refer to:

People

With the given name
 Diah Hadaning (1940—2021), Indonesian writer
 Diah Permata Megawati Setiawati Sukarnoputri (born 1947), Indonesian politician, fifth president of Indonesia from 2001 to 2004
 Diah Permatasari (actress) (born 1971), Indonesian actress
 Diah Permatasari (fencer) (born 1990), Indonesian fencer

With the surname
 Abel Peter Diah (born 1971), Nigerian politician
 Herawati Diah (1917–2016), Indonesian journalist

See also
 Dia (disambiguation)